The 2014 Southern Miss Golden Eagles football team represented the University of Southern Mississippi in the 2014 NCAA Division I FBS football season as a new member of the West Division of Conference USA. They were led by second-year head coach Todd Monken and played their home games at M. M. Roberts Stadium in Hattiesburg, Mississippi. They finished the season 3–9, 1–7 in C-USA play to finish in last place in the West Division.

Schedule

Schedule Source:
Confirmed ASN stations in the Southern Miss broadcast area- WXXV and WPMI

Game summaries

Mississippi State

*Mississippi State won the games on the field in 1975 and 1976, but were later forced to forfeit the games by the NCAA due to an NCAA rules violation in which offensive lineman Larry Gillard received a 33 percent discount at an Okolona, Mississippi clothing store.

Alcorn State

Alabama

Appalachian State

Rice

Middle Tennessee

North Texas

Louisiana Tech

UTEP

Marshall

UTSA

UAB

References

Southern Miss
Southern Miss Golden Eagles football seasons
Southern Miss Golden Eagles football